CDGSH iron sulfur domain 2 is a protein that in humans is encoded by the CISD2 gene.

Function

The protein encoded by this gene is a zinc finger protein that localizes to the endoplasmic reticulum. The encoded protein binds an iron/sulfur cluster and may be involved in calcium homeostasis. Defects in this gene are a cause of Wolfram syndrome 2. [provided by RefSeq, Mar 2011].

See also
 CDGSH iron sulfur domain

References

Further reading